, formerly known as Yokohama Maritime Museum is a museum in Yokohama, Kanagawa Prefecture, Japan.

Overview 
Juxtaposed with the 1989 Yokohama Expo, celebrating 150 years of the port, the Yokohama Maritime Museum which focuses on the harbor and vessels in Nihon Maru Memorial Park, was renovated and re-opened in the spring of 2009.  At that time, the Yokohama Maritime Museum was rebranded at the "Yokohama Port Museum".

Exhibit contents
 History zone of Yokohama Port
There is an exhibition on the history of Yokohama Port since the arrival of the black ship
 Rediscovering zone at Yokohama Port
There are exhibits related to harbor loading and shipbuilding, and a marine vessel ship simulator

References

External links

 
 City of Yokohama

Museums in Yokohama
Maritime museums in Japan
Minato Mirai 21
Museums established in 1989
1989 establishments in Japan